A vapour pressure thermometer is a thermometer that uses a pressure gauge to measure the vapour pressure of a liquid.

References

Thermometers